Adrian Radu Gontariu (born May 14, 1984) is a Romanian volleyball player, a member of Romania men's national volleyball team and Romanian club Remat Zalău, four-time Romanian Champion (2003, 2004, 2005, 2007), three-time German Champion (2010, 2011, 2015), Polish Champion (2012).

Career

Clubs
In 2014 he joined to German club VfB Friedrichshafen. On March 1, 2015 he won German Cup with VfB Friedrichshafen.

Sporting achievements

Clubs

CEV Cup
  2011/2012 - with Asseco Resovia Rzeszów

National championships
 2002/2003  Romanian Cup, with Deltacons Tulcea
 2002/2003  Romanian Championship, with Deltacons Tulcea
 2003/2004  Romanian Championship, with Deltacons Tulcea
 2004/2005  Romanian Championship, with Deltacons Tulcea
 2005/2006  Romanian Cup, with Tomis Constanța
 2005/2006  Romanian Championship, with Tomis Constanța
 2006/2007  Romanian Cup, with Tomis Constanța
 2006/2007  Romanian Championship, with Tomis Constanța
 2009/2010  German Championship, with VfB Friedrichshafen
 2010/2011  German Championship, with VfB Friedrichshafen
 2011/2012  Polish Championship, with Asseco Resovia Rzeszów
 2014/2015  German Cup, with VfB Friedrichshafen
 2014/2015  German Championship, with VfB Friedrichshafen

References

External links
 PlusLiga player profile

1984 births
Living people
People from Zalău
Romanian men's volleyball players
Romanian expatriate sportspeople in the United Arab Emirates
Romanian expatriates in Germany
Expatriate volleyball players in Poland
Romanian expatriates in Poland
Projekt Warsaw players
Resovia (volleyball) players